Foster Andersen (March 11, 1940 – April 26, 2004) was an American football player and coach. An accomplished athlete at UCLA, he was drafted by the Los Angeles Rams in 1962 NFL Draft. Andersen embarked on a long coaching tenure in the junior college, college and National Football League (NFL) ranks. He served as the head football coach at Cal State Los Angeles from 1971 to 1973, compiling a record of 9–21–1.  He also had coaching stints at University of California, Los Angeles (UCLA), University of Southern California (USC), and with the Los Angeles Rams.

Head coaching record

References

1940 births
2004 deaths
American football tackles
Cal State Los Angeles Diablos football coaches
Cal State Northridge Matadors football coaches
UCLA Bruins football players
Los Angeles Rams coaches
UCLA Bruins football coaches
USC Trojans football coaches
Junior college football coaches in the United States